This is a list of Hungarian Jews.  There has been a Jewish presence in today's Hungary since Roman times (bar a brief expulsion during the Black Death), long before the actual Hungarian nation. Jews fared particularly well under the Ottoman Empire, and after emancipation in 1867. At its height, the Jewish population of historical Hungary numbered more than 900,000, but the Holocaust and emigration, especially during the 1956 Hungarian Revolution, has reduced that to around 100,000, most of whom live in Budapest and its suburbs.

This is a list of anyone who could be reliably described as "Hungarian" and is of significant Jewish heritage (ethnic or religious). See List of Hungarian Americans for descendants of Hungarian émigrés born in America, a significant number of whom are of Jewish ancestry.

The names are presented in the Western European convention of the given name preceding the family name, whereas in Hungary, the reverse is true, as in most Asian cultures.

Historical figures

 Leó Frankel, one of the leaders of the Paris Commune
 Gyula Germanus, islamologist, (non-Jewish mother, Jewish father)
 Ignác Goldziher, islamologist
 Tivadar Herzl (Theodor Herzl), spiritual founder of Israel
 Béla Kun, de facto leader of Hungary for 4 months in 1919 (non-Jewish mother, Jewish father)
 Max Nordau, co-founder of the World Zionist Organization
 Tom Lantos
 György Lukács
 Trebitsch Lincoln, British adventurer
 Georges Politzer
 Joseph Pulitzer, newspaper publisher
 Sándor Radó (Alexander Radó) Switzerland-based Soviet master spy in World War II
 Mátyás Rákosi, de facto leader of Hungary, 1947–1956
 Ervin Szabó director of the Budapest Public Library System, 1911–1918
 Tibor Szamuely, politician
 Ármin Vámbéry, orientalist and traveler
 Vilmos Vázsonyi, first Jewish Justice minister of Hungary, 1917–1918

Athletes

Boxing

 György Gedó, Olympic champion light flyweight

Canoeing
 László Fábián, sprint canoer, Olympic champion (K-2 10,000 meter), 4x world champion (3x K-2 10,000 meter and 1x K-4 10,000 meter) and one silver (K-4 10,000 meter)
 Imre Farkas, sprint canoer, 2x Olympic bronze (C-2 1,000 and 10,000 meter)
 Klára Fried-Bánfalvi, sprint canoer, Olympic bronze (K-2 500 m), world champion (K-2 500 m)
 Anna Pfeffer, sprint canoer, Olympic 2x silver (K-2 500 m), bronze (K-1 500 m); world champion (K-2 500 m), silver (K-4 500 m), 2x bronze (K-2 500)

Fencing

 Péter Bakonyi (born "Buchwald", 1938), saber, Olympic 3x bronze
 Ilona Elek (née "Schacherer"; 1907–1988), foil fencer; Olympic gold-medal winner, and world champion, both before and after World War II
 Dr. Dezső Földes (1880–1950), saber, 2x Olympic champion
 Dr. Jenő Fuchs (1882–1955), saber, 4x Olympic champion
 Tamás Gábor (1932–2007), épée, Olympic champion
 János Garay (1889–1945), saber, Olympic champion, silver, bronze, killed by the Nazis
 Dr. Oskar Gerde (1883–1944), saber, 2x Olympic champion, killed by the Nazis
 Dr. Sándor Gombos (1895–1968), saber, Olympic champion
 Endre Kabos (1906–1944), saber, 3x Olympic champion, bronze, killed while performing forced labour for the Nazis
 Attila Petschauer (1904–1943), saber, 2x team Olympic champion, silver, killed by the Nazis
 Zoltán Ozoray Schenker (1880–1966), Hungarian Olympic champion saber fencer
 Ildikó Újlaky-Rejtő (born 1937), foil, 2x Olympic champion
 Lajos Werkner (1883–1943), saber, 2x Olympic champion
 George Worth, born György Woittitz (1915–2006), Hungarian-born American Olympic medalist fencer

Figure skating
 Lily Kronberger, World Championship 4x gold, 2x bronze, World Figure Skating Hall of Fame
 Emília Rotter, pair skater, World Championship 4x gold, silver, 2x Olympic bronze
 László Szollás, pair skater, World Championship gold, silver, 2x Olympic bronze

Gymnastics

 Samu Fóti, Olympic silver (team combined exercises)
 Imre Gellért, Olympic silver (team combined exercises)
 Ágnes Keleti, 5 time Olympic champion (2 time floor exercises, asymmetrical bars, floor exercises, balance beam, team exercise with portable apparatus), 3 time silver (2 time team combined exercises, individual combined exercises), 2x bronze (asymmetrical bars, team exercises with portable apparatus), International Gymnastics Hall of Fame
 Alice Kertész, Olympic champion (team, portable apparatus), silver (team); world silver (team)

Soccer (association football)

 Gyula Bíró, midfielder/forward (national team)
 Alfréd Brüll, first owner of MTK Budapest FC
 Peter Fuzes, born in Hungary; soccer goalkeeper for Sydney Hakoah club and Australia, Maccabi Hall of Fame 2003. Played 1st grade 1964 till 1976; International career from 1966 to 1972, against Scotland 1967, Greece 1969, Israel 1969 & 1972. Played against various European club sides including AS ROMA 1966, Manchester United.
 Sándor Geller, goalkeeper, Olympic champion
 Béla Guttmann, midfielder, national team player, and international coach
 Adolf Kertész, Hungarian international
 Gyula Kertész (1888–1982), Hungarian international
 Vilmos Kertész (1890–1962), Hungarian international 
 Gyula Mándi, half back (player & coach of Hungarian and Israeli national teams) and manager
 Árpád Orbán, Olympic champion

Swimming

 Andrea Gyarmati, Olympic silver (100-m backstroke) and bronze (100-m butterfly); world championships bronze (200-m backstroke), International Swimming Hall of Fame (both parents half-Jewish)
 Alfréd Hajós (born "Arnold Guttmann"), 3x Olympic champion (100-m freestyle, 800-m freestyle relay, 1,500-m freestyle), International Swimming Hall of Fame
 Michael "Miki" Halika, Israel, 200-m butterfly, 200- and 400-m individual medley
 József Munk, Olympic silver (4x200-m freestyle relay)
 Rebecca Soni, her grandfather was born in Nagyvárad (now Oradea)
 Mark Spitz, his great-grandfather (Nathan) was born in Hungary
 László Szabados, Olympic bronze (4x200-m freestyle relay)
 András Székely, Olympic silver (200-m breaststroke) and bronze (4x200-m freestyle relay); died in a Nazi concentration camp
 Éva Székely, Olympic champion & silver (200-m breaststroke); International Swimming Hall of Fame; mother of Andrea Gyarmati (mother Jewish, father Roman Catholic szekler)
 Judit Temes, Olympic champion (4×100-m freestyle), bronze (100-m freestyle)
 Imre Zachár, Olympic silver (4x200-m freestyle relay)

Table tennis
 Viktor Barna (born "Győző Braun"), 22 time world champion, International Table Tennis Foundation Hall of Fame ("ITTFHoF")
 Laszlo Bellak, 7 time world champion, ITTFHoF
 Anna Sipos, 11 time world champion, ITTFHoF
 Miklós Szabados, 15 time world champion

Tennis
 Zsuzsa Körmöczy, won 1958 French Open Singles, world # 2.

Track and field

 Ödön Bodor, Olympic bronze (medley relay)
 Ibolya Csák, Olympic champion & European champion high jumper
 Mór Kóczán, javelin, Olympic bronze (Calvinist priest)

Water polo

 Robert Antal, Olympic champion
 István Barta, Olympic champion, gold
 György Bródy, (3g1b & 2g & 2g), goalkeeper, 2 time Olympic champion
 Dezső Gyarmati, Olympic water polo player & captain (3g1s1b) (half Jewish)
 György Kárpáti, 3 time Olympic champion, 1 time bronze (half Jewish)
 Béla Komjádi water polo player and coach, International Swimming Hall of Fame
 Mihály Mayer, 2 time Olympic champion, 2 time bronze
 Miklós Sárkány, 2 time Olympic champion
 Iván Somlai, 1976 Olympic Assistant Coach and Game Plan Manager of Team Canada

Wrestling
 Károly Kárpáti (also "Károly Kellner"), Olympic champion (freestyle lightweight), silver

Other sports
 Paul Havas, Columbia quarterback
 Ferenc Kemény, co-founder and first secretary of the IOC

Olympic gold medalists at the Summer Games

Before the Holocaust

Hungarian Jews, while comprising some 5% of the population of Hungary, won 8 individual gold medals for Hungary out of 26 (30.8%) in the Olympic sports events between 1896 and 1936. In each of the 7 gold winning teams, there were Hungarian Jews making up 35.8% of the teams (19 out of 53 team members).

1896
 Alfréd Hajós-Guttman (2) swimming, 100-meter freestyle, 1,500-meter freestyle

1906
 Alfréd Hajós-Guttman, swimming, 800-meter freestyle relay

1908
 Dezső Földes, fencing, team saber
 Dr.Jenő Fuchs (2), fencing, individual saber, team saber
 Dr. Oszkár Gerde, fencing, team saber
 Lajos Werkner, fencing, team saber
 Richard Weisz, Greco-Roman wrestling, heavyweight

1912
 Dezső Földes, fencing, team saber
 Dr. Jenő Fuchs (2), fencing, individual saber, team saber
 Dr. Oszkár Gerde, fencing, team saber
 Lajos Werkner, fencing, team saber

1924
 Alfred Hajós, Olympic art competition, architecture

1928
 János Garay, fencing, team saber
 Dr. Sándor Gombos, fencing, team saber
 Attila Petschauer, fencing, team saber
 Dr. Ferenc Mező, Olympic art competition, epic works

1932
 István Barta, water polo
 György Brody, water polo
 Miklós Sárkány, water polo
 Endre Kabos, fencing, team saber
 Attila Petschauer, fencing, team saber

1936
 György Bródy, water polo
 Miklos Sárkány, water polo
 Endre Kabos (2), fencing, individual saber, team saber
 Ilona Elek, individual foil
 Károly Kárpáti, freestyle wrestling, lightweight

After the Holocaust, 1948-1972

After the Holocaust, less than 1% of the population of Hungary remained of Jewish heritage.
In individual sports events, Hungary won 48 gold medals between 1948 and 1972. Sportsmen and mainly sportswomen of Jewish extraction won 10 gold medals (20.8%). Hungarian Jewish women won 7 gold medals out of the 15 individual gold medals won by Hungarian women. In the 19 gold medal-winning teams for Hungary, 9 had Jewish members.

There are no known Hungarian Jewish gold medalist since 1976. Overall, Hungarian Jews won 15.4% of the 117 individual gold medals of Hungary, and had part in at least 16 out of the 42 gold medals in team events.

1948
 Ilona Elek, individual foil

1952
 Robert Antal, water polo
 Sándor Gellér, soccer
 Ágnes Keleti, gymnastics, floor exercises
 Éva Székely, swimming, 200-meter breaststroke

1956
 Ágnes Keleti (4)
 gymnastics, asymmetrical bars, floor exercises, balance beam, 
 team exercise with portable apparatus
 Aliz Kertész, gymnastics, team exercise with portable apparatus
 László Fábián, kayak pairs, 10,000-meters

1960
 Gyula Török, boxing, flyweight

1964
 Tamás Gábor, fencing, team épée
 Ildikó Rejtő (2), fencing, individual and team foil
 Árpád Orbán, soccer

1968
 Mihály Hesz, kayak, K1 1000m

1972
 Gyorgy Gedó, boxing, light flyweight

Artists

 Imre Ámos, painter, born 1907 in Nagykálló, killed during the Holocaust
 Robert Capa, photographer
 Béla Czóbel
 Adolf Fényes
 André François, painter and graphic artist (Jewish father)
 György Goldmann, sculptor
 Lucien Hervé, born Laszlo Elkan, photographer, known best for his architectural photographs, particularly those associated with Le Corbusier.
 Béla Iványi-Grünwald
 André Kertész, born Andor Kertész, photographer, photo-essayist
 Ervin Marton
 George Mayer-Marton, born Gyorgy Mayer, artist
 László Moholy-Nagy
 Nickolas Muray, photographer, born Miklós Mandl, Szeged HU, 1892-1965 New York City, and Olympic fencer. Known for his advances in commercial photography, most notably the first use of color film.
 Izsák Perlmutter
 Kermit (Wayne) Weinberger, artist, designer, famous for his Las Vegas neon creations. Born to Jewish Hungarian parents.

Business

Businessmen

 Jim Breyer, venture capitalist
 Leo Castelli, Trieste-born American art dealer of note.
 Andrew Grove, one of the founders and the CEO of Intel
 Sándor Hatvany-Deutsch
 Paul Reichmann's parents were born in Hungary
 Tibor Rosenbaum, rabbi and businessman
 George Soros, Hungarian-American investor and philanthropist
 Sholam Weiss, bankruptcy specialist

Industrialists and bankers 
 Móric Fischer de Farkasházy, founder the Herend Porcelain Manufactory in 1839
 Leó Lánczy
Jenő Vida
Ferenc Chorin
Fülöp Weisz
Gedeon Richter

Chess players

 Rudolph Charousek
 Isidor Gunsberg
 Ignatz von Kolisch
 Andor Lilienthal
 Johann Löwenthal
 Judit Polgár
 Susan Polgár
 Zsófia Polgár
 Richard Réti
 Adolf Schwarz
 Endre Steiner
 Herman Steiner
 Lajos Steiner
 László Szabó

Film and stage

Actors

 Gábor Baraker
 Jerry Seinfeld (paternal side)
 Eva Bartok (father Jewish, born Szöke)
 Tony Curtis; his parents were born in Mátészalka.
 Franciska Gaal; born Jewish as Szidónia Silberspitz
 Miklós Gábor
 Zsa Zsa Gabor, born in Budapest, Hungary
 Dezső Garas
 Gyula Gózon
 Leslie Howard's father was born in Hungary
 Gyula Kabos
 Harry Houdini born in Budapest, Hungary
 Hedy Lamarr
 Kálmán Latabár (mother Jewish)
 Peter Lorre
 László Márkus
 Imre Ráday
 Márton Rátkai
 Kálmán Rózsahegyi
 Eva Six (father Jewish)
 Paul Newman (father Jewish)
 Zoltán Várkonyi

Directors, screenwriters, and industry
 George Cukor, film director
 Michael Curtiz, born Manó Kertész Kaminer, film director
 Judit Elek, film director and screenwriter
 Béla Gaál film director
 Viktor Gertler, film editor and director
 Harry Houdini
 Alexander Korda, born Sándor László Kellner, brother of Vincent and Zoltan Korda, film producer and director
 Vincent Korda, born Vincent Kellner, brother of Alexander and Zoltan Korda, art director
 Zoltán Korda, born Zoltán Kellner, brother of Alexander and Vincent Korda, film screenwriter, director, and producer
 László Nemes, film director (mother Jewish)
 Paul Newman's father was born in Hungary, as was his Catholic mother
 Joe Pasternak
 Emeric Pressburger
 S. Z. Sakall
 István Szabó, film director, screenwriter, and opera director
 István Székely film director
 János Szász, film director
 Alexandre Trauner
 Rachel Weisz's father was born in Hungary
 Adolph Zukor, founder of Paramount Pictures

Historians

 Ignác Acsády, historian
 Ignác Kúnos, linguist
 John Lukacs, historian (Roman Catholic, with a Jewish mother)
 Géza Vermes, historian

Inventors and scientists
 László Bíró, inventor of the ballpoint pen
 Marcel Breuer architect
 Dennis Gabor, inventor of the holography
 David Gestetner, inventor of the stencil duplicator
 Peter Carl Goldmark, inventor of long-playing (LP) records
 András Gróf (Andrew Grove), pioneer of the semiconductor industry, CEO of Intel
 Rudolf E. Kálmán of Kalman filter
 Gedeon Richter, pharmaceuticals; inventor and industrialist
 David Schwarz, inventor of the Zeppelin
 Charles Weissmann, biochemist
 Eugene Wigner (Wigner Jenő), physicist and Nobel laureate (parents were Lutheran by religion)
 Gabor A. Somorjai (Hungarian-American) the "father" of modern surface-chemistry, leading world-expert on heterogeneous catalysis by metal surfaces

Nobel Prize winners
 Robert Bárány (1914) - Medicine
 György Hevesy (George de Hevesy) (1943) - Chemistry (born Roman Catholic)
 Jenő Wigner (Eugene Wigner) (1963) - Physics (Lutheran convert)
 Dénes Gábor (Dennis Gabor) (1971) - Physics (Lutheran convert)
 Milton Friedman (1976) - Economics
 János Polányi (John Charles Polanyi) (1986) - Chemistry (born Roman Catholic)
 Elie Wiesel (1986-2016) - Peace
 János Harsányi (John Harsanyi) (1994) - Economics (born Roman Catholic)
 Imre Kertész (2002) - Literature
 Ferenc Herskó (Avram Hershko) (2004) - Chemistry

Physicists
 Dennis Gabor
 Theodore von Kármán
 John von Neumann
 Paul Nemenyi
 Leó Szilárd
 Edward Teller
 László Tisza
 Eugene Wigner

Social scientists
 Peter Thomas Bauer, economist
 Milton Friedman, his parents emigrated from Beregszász, then in Hungary.
 Frank Furedi, sociologist
 John Harsanyi, economist, game theory; Nobel laureate (born Roman Catholic, from a Jewish background)
 Nicholas Kaldor, British economist
 János Kornai, economist
 Gottlieb Wilhelm Leitner (1840–1899), educationist and orientalist
 Karl Mannheim sociologist,
 Adolf Neubauer, Hebraist
 Karl Polanyi, economist and philosopher

Mathematicians

 Raoul Bott (ethnically Jewish through mother)
 Arthur Erdélyi
 Paul Erdős
 Lipót Fejér
 Michael Fekete
 László Fuchs
 Tibor Gallai
 Géza Grünwald
 Alfréd Haar
 Paul Halmos
 László Kalmár
 John Kemeny
 Dénes Kőnig
 Gyula Kőnig
 Imre Lakatos
 Kornél Lőwy (Cornelius Lanczos)
 Peter Lax
 John von Neumann (Roman Catholic convert)
 Rózsa Péter
 George Pólya
 Tibor Radó
 Alfréd Rényi
 Frigyes Riesz
 Marcel Riesz
 Lajos Schlesinger
 Otto Szász
 Gábor Szegő
 Peter Szüsz
 Pál Turán
 Abraham Wald
 Eugene Wigner

Music

Composers

 Pál Ábrahám
 Károly Goldmark
 Gábor Darvas
 André Hajdu, composer, educator
 Imre Kálmán (Emmerich Kálmán)
 György Kurtág (half Jewish)
 Sándor Kuti, composer
 György Ligeti
 Miklós Rózsa, composer
 Rezső Seress
 Sándor Vándor, composer, educator
 László Weiner, composer
 Leó Weiner, composer
 Pál Hermann, composer, virtuoso cellist

Conductors

 Ádám Fischer
 Ivan Fischer
 Ferenc Fricsay (half Jewish through mother)
 György Justus, composer, musicologist, choir master
 István Kertész
 Jenő Ormándy (Eugene Ormandy)
 Fritz Reiner
 Sir Georg Solti
 György Széll (George Szell)

Musicians

 Pál Budai, pianist, composer
 Ádám Fischer, conductor
 Peter Frankl, pianist
 Endre Granat, violinist
 István Kertész, conductor
 Ervin Nyiregyházi, pianist (half Jewish through mother)
 György Pauk, violinist
 Tommy Ramone, drummer for The Ramones (born Erdélyi Tamás)
 János Sándor, conductor
 Ervin Schiffer, violist
 György Schiffer, cellist 
 Georg Solti, conductor
 Mark Freuder Knopfler, guitar, Dire Straits,

Performers of music

 Gitta Alpár - voice, soprano & actress
 Geza Anda - piano (half Jewish)
 Ilona Fehér - violin
 Annie Fischer - piano
 Joseph Joachim - violin
 Endre Granat - violin
 György Pauk - violin
 László Polgár - voice, bass
 Ede Reményi - violin
 Márk Rózsavölgyi - violin
 István Nádas - piano
 András Schiff - piano
 János Starker - violoncello
 Mihály Székely - voice, bass
 Joseph Szigeti - violin

Psychoanalysts

 Michael Balint, psychoanalyst
 René Spitz, psychoanalyst.
 Sándor Ferenczi, psychoanalyst.
 Géza Róheim
 Lipót Szondi, psychiatrist
 Thomas Szasz, psychiatrist

Religious figures

See Hungarian-Jewish Religious Figures

Writers

 Béla Balázs, poet & film critic
 Tibor Déry
 Renée Erdős
 György Faludy
 Milán Füst
 Ágnes Heller.
 Ferenc Karinthy
 Imre Kertész, winner, Nobel Prize in Literature (2002)
 Arthur Koestler, novelist & critic
 György Konrád
 Rudolf Lothar, dramatist
 György Lukács, Marxist literary critic and philosopher.
 Kati Marton
 George Mikes
 György Moldova
 Ferenc Molnár
 Péter Nádas
 , creator of Hungarian cabaret
 István Örkény
 Károly Pap
 Erno Polgar
 Giorgio Pressburger
 Miklós Radnóti, poet
 Jenő Rejtő
 György Spiró
 Gábor T. Szántó
 Antal Szerb
 Ephraim Kishon, born as Ferenc Hoffmann, Hungarian-Israeli writer, satirist, and film director.
 Dezső Szomory
 Paul Tenczer
 József Vészi
 Elie Wiesel, writer, Nobel Peace Prize (1986)
 Béla Zsolt writer of Kilenc Koffer

Families ennobled between 1874 and 1918 (mainly industrialists)

 Biedermann – 1902 	
 Dirsztay – 1905 	
 Engel – 1879
 Groedl – 1900 	
 Gutmann – 1905
 Harkányi – 1904 	
 Hatvany – 1917
 Hatvany-Deutsch – 1895 	
 Hazai – 1912 	
 Herczel – 1912 	
 Herzog – 1904
 Kohner – 1904
 Korányi – 1912
 Kornfeld – 1908 	
 Königswarter – 1897 	
 Kuffner – 1904 	
 Lévay – 1897
 Madarassy-Beck – 1906 	
 Nauman – 1906 	
 Ohrenstein – 1913 	
 Orosdy – 1905
 Posner Karl	
 Schosberger – 1890 	
 Tornyai-Schosberger – 1905
 Ulmann – 1918 	
 Weiss – 1918 	
 Wodianer – 1874
 Wolfner – 1918

See also
List of Hungarians
History of the Jews in Hungary

References

General references

External links
Jewish Hungarians and Hungarian Jews

Lists of Jews by country
Jews
Jews,Hungarian

de:Geschichte der Juden in Ungarn#Personen mit ungarisch-jüdischen Wurzeln